Min Nemi was governor of Toungoo (Taungoo) from 1399 to 1408/09. He was also a military commander, whose regional army consisted of 60 war elephants, and fought in the Forty Years' War. He ruled for nearly ten years.

Notes

References

Bibliography
 
 
 

Ava dynasty